SS N. Y. U. Victory was a Type C2 Victory ship-based VC2-S-AP2 troop transport built for the U.S. Army Transportation Corps late in World War II.  Launched in May 1945, it saw service in the European Theater of Operations in the immediate post-war period repatriating U.S. troops.

After being laid up in the U.S., SS N. Y. U. Victory was purchased by Argentinian shipping line Empresa Líneas Marítimas Argentinas and renamed Cordoba. She was scrapped at Campana in March 1972.

History

Construction and operation
SS N. Y. U. Victory was laid down 26 March 1945 as a U.S. MARCOM Type C2 ship-based VC2-S-AP2 hull by Bethlehem-Fairfield Shipyard of Baltimore, Maryland. Launched 26 May 1945, she was then converted into a dedicated troopship, and delivered to the War Shipping Administration on 23 June 1945.

World War II

Units transported
Units transported by the SS N. Y. U. Victory include:
 1269th Engineer Combat Battalion, August 1945.

Post-war
After being briefly laid up in the U.S., SS N.Y.U. Victory was purchased by Argentinian shipping line Empresa Líneas Marítimas Argentinas and renamed Cordoba. She was scrapped at Campana in March 1972.

See also
 SS Maritime Victory, a similar VC2-S-AP2 Victory ship conversion into a dedicated troopship
 SS American Victory, a similar VC2-S-AP2 vessel preserved as a museum ship

References

 

Victory ships
Ships built in Baltimore
1945 ships
World War II merchant ships of the United States